Rasau is an area in Brunei.  The area contains one of the two oil fields of Brunei, the Rasau Field, and a small village, Kampong Rasau, which has a population of 103.

Location
Rasau is located in the Belait district on the west bank of the Belait River south of Kampong Sungai Teraban, close to the district capital of Kuala Belait.  It is one of the villages in Mukim Kuala Belait. It is located at 114°11′E longitude and 4°34′N latitude.  To the north lies Kampong Sungai Teraban.  The Malaysian state of Sarawak lies to the west and south with the Asam Paya oil field to the southwest.  Across the Belait River to the east lies the southern portion of Kuala Belait and Kampong Sungai Duhon.

History
Rasau was historically one of the first stops on the Belait River upriver from Kuala Belait towards the former district administrative capital of Kuala Balai. It was founded further inland from the mouth of the Belait River and Kuala Belait for protection against pirates. A timber jetty used to exist in the area in 1930. Moreover latter that year, British Malayan Petroleum Company constructed a telephone line along the Kuala Belait Beach which linked up Seria and Rasau with their main headquarters in Kuala Belait.

Commercial hydrocarbons were first discovered in Rasau in 1979, and production began in 1983. A blowout of one of the wells in the Rasau Field, Rasau-17 occurred in April 1989. The resulting fire lasted from 25 April to 8 May when it was finally extinguished.

Rasau gained prominence in the latter half of the 20th century when a bridge was built across the Belait River providing a route to Miri in Sarawak, Malaysia without the need for any ferry crossings across the Belait River.  However, the bridge was not opened until after a family of Malaysians drowned at the ferry point during heavy rain.

Population

Kampong Rasau 
The small village of Kampong Rasau is located to the south of the Rasau Bridge. It has a population of 103, and is situated further upriver from Kuala Belait towards Kuala Balai. This was formerly a village of hunter-gatherers and fishermen.

The modern day Kampong Rasau serves as a suburb of the nearby Kuala Belait. Villagers residing in Kampong Rasau can obtain a special permit to waive toll payment across the Rasau Bridge. This allows the villagers to conveniently travel across the Belait River for employment opportunities.

A shipyard, on the opposite bank from the Port of Kuala Belait at Kampong Sungai Duhon in Rasau, is a major source of employment for the people from the village and the greater Kuala Belait area.

Economy

Oil and gas 
Rasau is dominated by the Rasau Field which is one of the two onshore oil fields in Brunei. The field is operated by Brunei Shell Petroleum (BSP) and was discovered in 1979, although production from the field did not start until 1983. Most of the wells are located between the highway linking the Rasau Bridge to Sungai Tujoh in the Rasau area. However, some of the Rasau wells are on the east side of the Belait River in Kampong Sungai Duhon and Kampong Pandan.

The Rasau Production Station is located in the Rasau area. Pipelines connect it to the tank farms in Seria via Mumong, and to the Refinery of Seria, via Kuala Belait. Hydrocarbons from Malaysia's Asam Paya field in Sarawak, across the border from Rasau is piped into Rasau. The well Rasau 5 had a depth of 9,000 ft.

Transportation

Road 
The main highway from Bandar Seri Begawan to the Malaysian border passes through Rasau. The road is a single carriageway and it is surfaced. It connects the Seria Bypass and the Rasau Bridge to the 11 km road between Kampong Sungai Teraban and Sungai Tujoh. The Rasau Bridge across the Belait River is a toll bridge. The tolls ranges from B$3 for a passenger car to over $20 for a commercial long vehicle. An unsurfaced road connects the village of Kampong Rasau to the Rasau bridge.

Water 
A "water taxi" can be hired at the public wharf close to the Kuala Belait market to go upriver towards Kampong Rasau and Kuala Balai.

Air 
Commercial travellers would have to travel to either Bandar Seri Begawan's Brunei International Airport or Miri's Airport to catch a commercial flight. The Anduki Airfield in Belait District is the nearest private heliport owned by BSP.

References

Belait District
Populated places in Brunei
Oil fields in Brunei
Peak oil